The conus papillaris is a feature of the reptilian eye which originates from the ventro-temporal optic nerve head and rises into the vitreous. It is believed to supply retinal nutrition. It is similar in function to the avian pecten oculi. It is functionless in adult crocodilians, and has been almost entirely replaced by other structures in most snakes.

References 

Reptile anatomy
Eye

nl:Conus papillaris